Weimar I – Weimarer Land II is an electoral constituency (German: Wahlkreis) represented in the Landtag of Thuringia. It elects one member via first-past-the-post voting. Under the current constituency numbering system, it is designated as constituency 31. It covers the eastern part of Weimarer Land and small parts of the city of Weimar.

Weimar I – Weimarer Land II was created for the 1994 state election. It was originally named Weimar-Land II, but was renamed to Weimarer Land II after the 1994 election. It took its current name before the 2014 election after obtaining a small part of the city of Weimar. Since 2019, it has been represented by Thomas Gottweis of the Christian Democratic Union (CDU).

Geography
As of the 2019 state election, Weimar I – Weimarer Land II covers the eastern part of Weimarer Land and small parts of the city of Weimar, specifically the municipalities of Apolda, Bad Sulza, Eberstedt, Großheringen, Ilmtal-Weinstraße (excluding Leutenthal und Rohrbach), Niedertrebra, Obertrebra, Rannstedt, Saaleplatte, and Schmiedehausen (from Weimarer Land), and the city districts (Ortsteile) of Schöndorf, Süßenborn, and Tiefurt/Dürrenbacher Hütte (from Weimar).

Members
The constituency has been held by the Christian Democratic Union since its creation in 1994. Its first representative was Christine Lieberknecht, who served from 1994 to 2019. Since 2004, it has been represented by Thomas Gottweis.

Election results

2019 election

2014 election

2009 election

2004 election

1999 election

1994 election

References

Electoral districts in Thuringia
1994 establishments in Germany
Weimarer Land
Weimar
Constituencies established in 1994